Anawrahta Minsaw (11 May 1014 – 11 April 1077) was the founder of the Pagan Empire. Considered the father of the Burmese nation, Anawrahta turned a small principality in the dry zone of Upper Burma into the first Burmese Empire that formed the basis of modern-day Burma (Myanmar). Historically verifiable Burmese history begins with his accession to the Pagan throne in 1044.

Anawrahta unified the entire Irrawaddy valley for the first time in history, and placed peripheral regions such as the Shan States and Arakan (Rakhine) under Pagan's suzerainty. He successfully stopped the advance of Khmer Empire into Tenasserim coastline and into Upper Menam valley, making Pagan one of two main kingdoms in mainland Southeast Asia.

A strict disciplinarian, Anawrahta implemented a series of key social, religious and economic reforms that would have a lasting impact in Burmese history. His social and religious reforms later developed into the modern-day Burmese culture. By building a series of weirs, he turned parched, arid regions around Pagan into the main rice granaries of Upper Burma, giving Upper Burma an enduring economic base from which to dominate the Irrawaddy valley and its periphery in the following centuries. He bequeathed a strong administrative system that all later Pagan kings followed until the dynasty's fall in 1287. The success and longevity of Pagan's dominance over the Irrawaddy valley laid the foundation for the ascent of Burmese language and culture, the spread of Burman ethnicity in Upper Burma.

Anawrahta's legacy went far beyond the borders of modern Burma. His embrace of Theravada Buddhism and his success in stopping the advance of Khmer Empire, a Hindu state, provided the Buddhist school, which had been in retreat elsewhere in South and Southeast Asia, a much needed reprieve and a safe shelter. He helped restart Theravada Buddhism in Ceylon, the Buddhist school's original home. The success of Pagan dynasty made Theravada Buddhism's later growth in Lan Na (northern Thailand), Siam (central Thailand), Lan Xang (Laos), and Khmer Empire (Cambodia) in the 13th and 14th centuries possible.

Anawrahta is one of the most famous kings in Burmese history. His life stories (legends) are a staple of Burmese folklore and retold in popular literature and theater.

Early life

Anawrahta was born Min Saw to King Kunhsaw Kyaunghpyu and Queen Myauk Pyinthe on 11 May 1044. The Burmese chronicles do not agree on the dates regarding his life and reign. The table below lists the dates given by the four main chronicles. Among the chronicles, scholarship usually accepts Zata's dates, which are considered to be the most accurate for the Pagan period. Scholarship's dates for Anawrahta's birth, death and reign dates are closest to Zata's dates.

In 1021, when Min Saw was about six years old, his father was deposed by his step-brothers Kyiso and Sokkate. His father had been a usurper of the Pagan throne, who overthrew King Nyaung-u Sawrahan two decades earlier. Kunhsaw then married three of Nyaung-u's chief queens, two of whom were pregnant at the time, and subsequently gave birth to Kyiso and Sokkate. Kunhsaw had raised Sokkate and Kyiso as his own sons. After the putsch, Kyiso became king and Sokkate became heir-apparent. They forced their step-father to a local monastery, where Kunhsaw would live as a monk for the remainder of his life.

Min Saw grew up in the shadow of his two step-brothers, who viewed Min Saw as their youngest brother and allowed him to retain his princely status at the court. Min Saw and his mother attended Kunhsaw, and lived nearby the monastery. In 1038, Kyiso died, and was succeeded by Sokkate. Min Saw was loyal to the new king. He took wives, and had at least two sons (Saw Lu and Kyansittha) by the early 1040s.

Accession

In 1044 however, Min Saw raised a rebellion at nearby Mount Popa, and challenged Sokkate to single combat. According to the chronicles, the reason for his uprising was that Sokkate had just raised Min Saw's mother as queen. Sokkate is said to have addressed Min Saw as brother-son, which the latter took great offense. Sokkate accepted the challenge to single combat on horseback. On 11 August 1044, Min Saw slew Sokkate at Myinkaba, near Pagan. The king and his horse both fell into the river nearby.

Min Saw first offered the throne to his father. The former king, who had long been a monk, refused. On 16 December 1044, Min Saw ascended the throne with the title of Anawrahta, a Burmanized form of Sanskrit name Aniruddha (अनिरुद्ध). His full royal style was Maha Yaza Thiri Aniruddha Dewa. Burmese history now begins to be less conjectural.

Early reign: Consolidation of Central Burma

In the beginning, Anawrahta's principality was a small area—barely 200 miles north to south and about 80 miles from east to west, comprising roughly the present districts of Mandalay, Meiktila, Myingyan, Kyaukse, Yamethin, Magwe, Sagaing and Katha east of the Irrawaddy, and the riverine portions of Minbu and Pakkoku. To the north lay Nanzhao Kingdom, and to the east still largely uninhibited Shan Hills, to the south and the west the Pyus, and farther south still, the Mons.

Economic reforms
Anawrahta's first acts as king were to organize his kingdom. He graded every town and village according to the levy it could raise. He made great efforts to turn the arid parched lands of central Burma into a rice granary. He constructed the irrigation system, which is still used in Upper Burma today. He repaired the Meiktila Lake, and successfully built four weirs and canals (Kinda, Nga Laingzin, Pyaungbya, Kume) on the Panlaung river, and three weirs (Nwadet, Kunhse, Nga Pyaung) on the Zawgyi. (He also tried to control the Myitnge river but failed despite all his efforts. The work lasted three years and there were many casualties from fever.) He peopled the newly developed areas with villages, which under royal officers served the canals. The region, known as Ledwin (lit. the rice country) became the granary, the economic key of the north country. History shows that one who gained control of Kyaukse became kingmaker in Upper Burma.

Military organization
Anawrahta organized Pagan's military. His key men—known as the Four Great Paladins in Burmese history—were:
 Kyansittha, his son and lead general
 Nyaung-U Hpi, known as the great swimmer from Nyaung-U
 Nga Htwe Yu, former toddy tree climber from Myinmu (near Sagaing)
 Nga Lon Letpe, former farmer from near Mount Popa

Also at his service were Byatta, a Muslim (likely an Arab seaman) shipwrecked at Thaton, and his sons Shwe Hpyin Gyi and Shwe Hpyin Nge, (who later entered the pantheon of Burmese folk deities as Shwe Hpyin Brothers ).

Founding of Pagan Empire

By the mid-1050s, Anawrahta's reforms had turned Pagan into a regional power, and he looked to expand. Over the next ten years, he founded the Pagan Empire, the Irrawaddy valley at the core, surrounded by tributary kingdoms.

Shan Hills
His first efforts were in then lightly inhabited Shan Hills in the east and the north. He acquired allegiance of Shan Hills in two waves. In the early to mid-1050s, Anawrahta first visited the nearer Shan Hills in the east, and received tribute. He founded the Bawrithat Pagoda in Nyaungshwe. The second wave came in the late 1050s and early 1060s after his march to Nanzhao Kingdom. After his return from Nanzhao expedition, Shan chiefs along the route presented Anawrahta with tributes. Still, their allegiance was nominal and he had to establish 43 forts along the eastern foothills of which the following 33 still exist as villages.

The 43 forts were established per the royal order issued 7 February 1061 (12th waxing of Tabaung 422 ME).

Lower Burma
After his first Shan campaign, Anawrahta turned to the Mon-speaking kingdoms in the south, which like Pagan were merely large city-states in reality. He first received submission of the ruler of Pegu (Bago). But the Thaton Kingdom refused to submit. Anawrahta's armies, led by the "Four Paladins", invaded the southern kingdom in early 1057. After a 3-months' siege of the city of Thaton, on 17 May 1057, (11th waxing of Nayon, 419 ME), the Pagan forces conquered the city.

According to Burmese and Mon traditions, Anawrahta's main reason for the invasion was Thaton king Manuha's refusal to give him a copy of the Theravada Buddhist Canon. (Anawrahta had been converted to Theravada Buddhism from his native Ari Buddhism by Shin Arahan, a monk originally from Thaton.) In reality, it was merely a demand for submission couched in diplomatic language, and the real aim of his conquest of Thaton was to check the Khmer Empire's conquests in the Chao Phraya basin and encroachment into the Tenasserim coast.

The conquest of Thaton is seen as the turning point in Burmese history. Still according to traditional reconstruction, Anawrahta brought back over 30,000 people, many of them artisans and craftsmen to Pagan. These captives formed a community that later helped build thousands of monuments at Pagan, the remains of which today rival the splendors of Angkor Wat.

More recent research by historian Michael Aung-Thwin has argued forcefully that Thaton's contributions to the cultural transformation of Upper Burma are a post-Pagan legend without contemporary evidence, that Lower Burma in fact lacked a substantial independent polity prior to Pagan's expansion, and that Mon influence on the interior is greatly exaggerated. Possibly in this period, the delta sedimentation—which now extends the coastline by three miles a century—remained insufficient, and the sea still reached too far inland, to support a population even as large as the modest population of the late precolonial era.

At any rate, during the 11th century, Pagan established its Lower Burma and this conquest facilitated growing cultural exchange, if not with local Mons, then with India and with Theravada stronghold Ceylon (Sri Lanka).

Arakan
Anawrahta's next conquest was north Arakan (Rakhine). He marched over the pass from Ngape near Minbu to An in Kyaukphyu, and then laid siege to Pyinsa, then the capital of Arakan. He reportedly tried to bring home the giant Mahamuni Buddha but could not. He did take away the gold and silver vessels of the shrine.

There is no single unified Arakanese account to corroborate the event. Surviving Arakanese chronicles (from the 18th and 19th centuries) mention at least two separate raids from the east, as well as "visits" by Anawrahta and Kyansittha. According to the Arakanese accounts, the attacks from the east ousted kings Pe Byu and Nga Ton in succession. However, the dates are off by centuries with the ousted kings having reigned in the late 8th to early 9th centuries, 10th to 11th, or 11th to 12th centuries.

At any rate, as was the case with the Shan Hills, Anawrahta's suzerainty over north Arakan (separated by the Arakan Yoma range) was nominal. The "conquest" may have been more of a raid to prevent Arakanese raids into Burma, and some historians (Lieberman, Charney) do not believe he (or any other Pagan kings) had any "effective authority" over Arakan. If Pagan never established an administrative system to govern Arakan, it continued to foster a vassal relationship for the remainder of Pagan dynasty, occasionally placing its nominees to the Arakanese throne. Moreover, the Burmese language and script came to dominate the Arakan littoral over the next centuries. With Burmese influence came ties to Ceylon (Sri Lanka) and the gradual prominence of Theravada Buddhism.

Pateikkaya
Anawrahta also received tribute from the Buddhist kingdom of Pateikkaya. The location of the small kingdom remains in dispute. The Burmese chronicles report the location as northwest of Arakan and its kings Indian. But British historian GE Harvey reckoned that it was more likely nearer to the eastern Chin Hills.

External relations
As his kingdom expanded, Anawrahta came into contact with the Nanzhao Kingdom (the erstwhile home of the Burmans) in the northeast, and in the southeast, the Khmer Empire, the main power of mainland Southeast Asia at the time. He assisted fellow Theravada Buddhist Ceylon in its war against Hindu Chola invaders.

Khmer Empire
Pagan's conquest of Thaton shook the Mon world. Anawrahta also demanded tribute from other neighboring Mon Kingdoms, Haripunjaya and Dvaravati (in present-day northern and central Thailand). Haripunjaya reportedly sent in tribute but Dvaravati's overlord Khmer Empire instead invaded Tenasserim. Anawrahta sent his armies, again led by the four paladins, who repulsed the invaders. The Burmese chronicles referred to the Kingdom of Cambodia as the southeastern limit of the Pagan Empire.

Nanzhao Kingdom
After the Khmer advance was checked, Anawrahta turned his attention toward Nanzhao. Anawrahta led a campaign against the kingdom in the northeast. (According to a mid-17th century source, he began the march on 16 December 1757.) He advanced to Dali, the capital of Nanzhao Kingdom, ostensibly to seek a Buddha's tooth relic. As in the case of the request for the scriptures from Thaton, it was really a demand for tribute. The ruler of Nanzhao shut the gates, and would not give up the relic. After a long pause, two kings exchanged presents and conversed amicably. The Nanzhao ruler gave Anawrahta a jade image which had come into contact with the tooth.

Ceylon
In 1069, Vijayabahu I of Ceylon asked Anawrahta for aid against the Chola invaders from Tamil country. Anawrahta sent ships of supplies in aid of Buddhist Ceylon. In 1071, Vijayabahu who had defeated the Cholas asked Anawrahta for Buddhist scriptures and Buddhist monks. The Chola invasions had left the original home of Theravada Buddhism with so few monks that it was hard to convene a chapter and make valid ordinations. Anawrahta sent the monks and scriptures, and a white elephant as a present for Vijayabahu. The Burmese monks ordained or re-ordained the entire clergy of the island. In return, the Ceylonese king gave a replica of the Buddha Tooth of which Ceylon was the proud possessor. The replica was then enshrined in the Lawkananda Pagoda in Pagan.

Administration

Nation-building
The greatest achievement of Anawrahta was his consolidation of various ethnic groups into a single nation. He was careful that his own people, the Burmans, not flaunt themselves before other peoples. He continued to show regard for the Pyus, who had recently fallen from greatness. He retained the name Pyu for his kingdom although it was under the leadership of the Burmans. He showed regard for the Mons, and encouraged his people to learn from the Mons.

Anawrahta replaced the kings of Lower Burma (Pegu and Thaton) with governors. At Pegu, he allowed the king of Pegu to remain as a vassal king in appreciation of the latter's help in Anawrahta's conquest of Thaton. But after the vassal king's death, he appointed a governor. Due to geographical distances, other tributary areas such as Arakan and Shan Hills were allowed to retain hereditary chieftainships.

Religious reforms

In 1056, a Mon Theravada Buddhist monk named Shin Arahan made a fateful visit to Pagan, and converted its king Anawrahta to Theravada Buddhism from his native Ari Buddhism. The king had been dissatisfied with the enormous power of Ari monks over the people, and considered the monks, who ate evening meals, drank liquor, presided over animal sacrifices, and enjoyed a form of ius primae noctis, depraved. In Theravada Buddhism he found a substitute to break the power of the clergy.

From 1056 onwards, Anawrahta implemented a series of religious reforms throughout his kingdom. His reforms gained steam after his conquest of Thaton, which brought much needed scriptures and clergy from the vanquished kingdom. He broke the power of the Ari monks first by declaring that his court would no longer heed if people ceased to yield their children to the priests. Those who were in bondage of the priests gained freedom. Some of the monks simply disrobed or followed the new way. However, the majority of the monks who had wielded power for so long would not go away easily.

Anawrahta banished them in numbers; many of them fled to Popa Hill and the Shan Hills. He used traditional nat spirits to attract people to his new religion. Asked why he allowed the nats to be placed in Buddhist temples and pagodas, Anawrahta answered "Men will not come for the sake of new faith. Let them come for their old gods, and gradually they will be won over."

Urged on by Shin Arahan, Anawrahta tried to reform the very Theravada Buddhism he received from Thaton, which by most accounts, was in a state of decay, and increasingly influenced by Hinduism. (The Mon chronicles hint that Manuha was reprehensible for making a compromise with Hinduism. Shin Arahan left Thaton because he was unhappy with the decaying of Buddhism there.) He made Pagan a center of Theravada learning by inviting scholars from the Mon lands, Ceylon as well as from India where a dying Buddhism was being given a coup de grace by Muslim conquerors. The scholarship helped revitalize a more orthodox form of Theravada Buddhism.

To be sure, his reforms could not and did not achieve everything overnight. The spread of Theravada Buddhism in Upper Burma was gradual; it took over three centuries. Its monastic system did not achieve widespread village level penetration in more remote areas until as late as the 19th century. Nor did the Aris die out. Their descendants, known as forest dwelling monks, remained a powerful force patronized by the royalty down to the Ava period in the 16th century. Likewise, the nat worship continued (down to the present day). Even the Theravada Buddhism of Anawrahta, Kyansittha and Manuha was one still strongly influenced by Hinduism when compared to later more orthodox (18th and 19th century) standards. Tantric, Saivite, and Vaishnava elements enjoyed greater elite influence than they would later do, reflecting both the relative immaturity of early Burmese literacy culture and its indiscriminate receptivity to non-Burman traditions. Indeed, even today's Burmese Buddhism contains many animist, Mahayana Buddhist and Hindu elements.

He was the first of the "Temple Builders" of Pagan. His chief monument was the Shwezigon Pagoda. The work began in 1059 but was still unfinished at his death 18 years later. He also built the Shwesandaw Pagoda south of Pagan to house the hair relics presented by Pegu. Farther afield, he built other pagodas such as Shweyinhmyaw, Shwegu and Shwezigon near Meiktila.

Invention of Burmese alphabet
Scholarship believed until recently that Anawrahta commissioned the invention of the Burmese alphabet based on the Mon script, c. 1058, a year after the Thaton conquest. However, recent research finds that the Burmese alphabet had been in use at least since 1035, and if an 18th-century recast inscription is permissible as evidence, since 984 CE.

Governing style
Anawrahta was an energetic king who implemented many profound enduring political, socioeconomic and cultural changes. He was admired and feared but not loved by his subjects.

Historian Htin Aung writes:

(The queen in love with Kyansittha was Manisanda Khin U. The two young heroes executed were Shwe Hpyin Gyi and Shwe Hpyin Nge, who later entered the pantheon of Burmese nat spirits).

But people admired and feared him, and he was able to implement many of his ambitious multifaceted reforms.

Death
Anawrahta died on 11 April 1077 in the outskirts of Pagan. The chronicles hint that his enemies ambushed and killed him and then disposed of the body in such a way that it was never found. The chronicles state that a nat (spirit) appeared in the guise of wild buffalo and gored him to death, and then demons took away his body.

Legacy

Anawrahta is considered one of the greatest, if not the greatest, kings of Burmese history for he founded first "charter polity" of what would later become modern Burma. Not only did he greatly expand the Pagan Kingdom but he also implemented a series of political and administrative reforms that enabled his empire to dominate the Irrawaddy valley and its periphery for another 250 years.

Anawrahta's legacy went far beyond the borders of modern Burma. The success and longevity of Pagan's dominance over the Irrawaddy valley laid the foundation for the ascent of Burmese language and culture, the spread of Burman ethnicity in Upper Burma. His embrace of Theravada Buddhism and his success in stopping the advance of Khmer Empire, a Hindu kingdom, provided the Buddhist school, which had been in retreat elsewhere in South and Southeast Asia, a much-needed reprieve and a safe shelter. He helped restart Theravada Buddhism in Ceylon, the Buddhist school's original home. The success of Pagan dynasty made Theravada Buddhism's later growth in Lan Na, Siam, Lan Xang, and Cambodia, also due in a large part to Ceylon's interactions with those lands, in the 13th and 14th centuries possible.

In popular culture
Anawrahta's life stories and legends remain a popular subject of Burmese folklore. The love triangle involving Anawrahta, Kyansittha and Manisanda as well as the sad story of Saw Mon Hla, one of his queens, are a staple of Burmese theater. Due to his reputation as a stern father figure, he is not the central character in these stories where the main protagonist invariably is the romantic soldier-king Kyansittha.

Commemorations

 Anawrahta Road, a main avenue in Yangon
 UMS Anawrahta, Myanmar Navy Corvette
 Team Anawrahta, one of the five student teams in Burmese schools

Notes

References

Bibliography
 
 
 
 
 
 
 
 
 
 
 
 
 
 
 
 
 
 
 
 
 
 
 

Pagan dynasty
Burmese Buddhist monarchs
1014 births
1077 deaths
11th-century Burmese monarchs